UnityPoint Health - Allen Hospital is a 204-bed, not-for-profit community hospital serving the Cedar Valley. It is the busiest hospital in the Cedar Valley. Allen Hospital is an affiliate hospital of UnityPoint Health, which cares for one of every three patients in Iowa.

Services
The hospital features a cardiac care unit, which performs about 250 open heart procedures per year.  The hospital features a Level II neonatal nursery and delivers more than 1,000 babies a year. It has invested $1.4 million on the Da Vinci Surgical System in order to reduce costs and surgical wait times.

References

External links
 

UnityPoint Health
Hospitals in Iowa
Buildings and structures in Waterloo, Iowa